Australia 108 (previously 70 Southbank Boulevard) is a residential supertall skyscraper in the Southbank precinct of Melbourne, Victoria, Australia Having officially topped out in June 2020, it became the tallest building in Australia by roof height, surpassing the Eureka Tower, and the second-tallest building in Australia by full height, surpassed by Q1 Tower. 

Construction of the revised Fender Katsalidis Architects–design by Brookfield Multiplex commenced in 2015, and was completed in 2020.

In 2012, these plans were revised and resubmitted in favour of mixed–use residential and hotel skyscraper, reaching  and comprising 108 levels. This proposal was approved by the Government of Victoria in March 2013; however, it was shelved four months later after it struggled to meet conditions imposed by state and federal government authorities including VicRoads and the Civil Aviation Safety Authority.

Site 
The 70 Southbank Boulevard site is situated on the corner of City Road and Southbank Boulevard in the Southbank precinct of Melbourne. The land comprised two separately titled buildings, both of which had two levels.

The site was purchased by architecture firm Fender Katsalidis Architects in April 2008, for 14.2 million, after the original tenancies ran an expression of interest campaign.

Previous proposals

First proposal at 70 Southbank Boulevard (2009–2012)
In 2009, plans were submitted by Fender Katsalidis Architects to the City of Melbourne for an 400 million residential building to be built on the 70 Southbank Boulevard site. In its original proposal, the building, 70 Southbank Boulevard, was planned to be  in height and consist of 532 residential apartments, six levels of office space, a fresh food market and other retail amenities, spanning 72 floors. The building was designed to replicate the nearby Eureka Tower, also a Fender Katsalidis development. Nonda Katsalidis noted that his firm "wanted to re-create elements of what we had achieved at Eureka and apply it to 70 Southbank Boulevard" with the Eureka Tower.

The building development was approved by then–Victorian Planning Minister Justin Madden on 21 April 2010, a decision which received backlash from the City of Melbourne council, dubbing the development as "excessively high" and "at odds with the City of Melbourne's height guidelines for the area". In May 2010, the council lodged an appeal to the Victorian Civil and Administrative Tribunal (VCAT) to have the building permit overturned, asserting that the building surpassed the  height limit in the area's planning scheme. VCAT rejected the appeal and noted that the planning scheme did not specify a maximum height.

Nonetheless, in July 2012, the site was put up for sale through an international public expression of interest campaign and was listed at A$25 million. This was to allow the Fender Katsalidis partners time to "go in different directions".

Second proposal with 'Australia 108' moniker (2012–2013)
The new proposal integrated the previous plans, but went on to include more residential apartments, a six-star hotel, and a two-storey star-shaped sky lobby with restaurants and bars.

The residential section of the skyscraper would have comprised 646 apartments, throughout levels 13 to 81. This included a penthouse apartment on levels 80 and 81. Meanwhile, the hotel aspect of the skyscraper would have occupied levels 83 to 102 and feature 288 rooms. A prominent component of this proposal was its star-shaped sky lobby on the 83rd and 84th floors, which would have protruded  outside of the building, in similar vein to the Eureka Tower's Edge experience, only larger. The Commonwealth Star on the Flag of Australia was used as inspiration for the "starburst". Another design feature was the use of two metal-cladded beacon towers atop the skyscraper's roof.

Fender Katsalidis Architects incorporated the Chinese system of geomancy, known as Feng shui, when developing the new proposal. The building's name, height and top floor all contain the number 8, which "relates to prosperity, abundance and security".

The new proposal was subjected to a second planning application process for approval. On 5 March 2013, the City of Melbourne council voted to oppose the development, citing it as an "over-development of the site". The Lord Mayor of Melbourne, Robert Doyle, a Shrine of Remembrance trustee, argued that the building would exceed the council's planning scheme in the area by almost  and it could potentially create a  shadow over the Shrine of Remembrance. However, the Shrine's CEO, Denis Baguley, believed otherwise, stating, "I don't believe there are issues of overshadowing that will concern us." VCAT had already approved the project, but the final decision was up to Victorian Planning Minister Matthew Guy.

Despite concerns, the project received its final approval on 18 March 2013 by Guy, who went on to describe the development as "a magnificent addition to Melbourne's skyline. Australia 108 will be a signature development that will define Melbourne for decades to come."

The project was put on the market on 20 April 2013.

Construction on the 1 billion dollar development was to have commenced in 2014, and would have taken three to four years to build, with completion around 2018. The construction was expected to have created 300 jobs in construction and hospitality industries.

At the time, it was claimed that the tower would have extended  into Essendon Airport's flight path "envelope," whose southerly approach requires a  height limit to any potential obstruction within  of the airfield. When asked about this situation, architect Nonda Katsilidis claimed that the flight paths would not be a problem, and that a technical solution could be drawn up if required. He also stressed that any design changes would be "minimal".

Despite this, the project (in its original form) was officially shelved in July 2013, following its inability to meet a "hybrid of requirements" from authorities such as VicRoads and CASA - the latter of which stated that there was "no flexibility" to approve a building that breached height restrictions. Consequently, Planning Minister Guy held talks with Deputy Prime Minister Warren Truss, regarding the height restrictions on inner city buildings.

Final iteration (2013–present)

Planning, design, and approval

The project was bought for approximately $30 million by Singapore developer Aspial Corporation, during late 2013. Plans were later resubmitted to the Department of Planning in 2014, for a new proposal; a 100-storey, -tall apartment tower, to comprise 1,105 apartments (a gain of 500 from the previous proposal). The hotel from the superseded design was removed from the plans, making the project solely residential. The star-shaped sky lobby feature from the previous proposal was incorporated in the design of the building, albeit with various purposes (as opposed to a public observation), and would be located on levels 69 through to 71.

Approval for this proposal was granted by Minister Guy on 25 June 2014.

Launch 
Australia 108 was launched to the public on 14 February 2015, having already secured up to 300 buyers during a soft pre-launch period. Less than a month following its launch, 1,000 of the 1,105 apartments had been sold. This includes the sale of the of penthouse spread across the 100th floor — the "tallest" home in the southern hemisphere. It was sold for A$25 million, an Australian record at the time, to a businessman based in China. By July 2015, almost all of the apartments were sold and in October 2015 only 33 apartments remained on the market. The cheaper apartments on the lower storeys sold for $450,000.

Construction and completion

The initial aspect of the construction phase, demolition and site preparation, was completed in early 2015. Construction on the $900 million residential skyscraper itself, commenced in October 2015, with work on the skyscraper's foundation having concluded in July 2016. In September 2015, Aspial Corporation announced their formal appointment of Brookfield Multiplex as the main contractor of Australia 108. Kone, an international engineering and service company, secured an order to supply 13 elevators to Australia 108 in March 2016. By April 2018, the building's core reached its 50th level – marking the halfway point of the skyscraper. 

The skyscraper was completed in 2020 and underwent construction in 5 stages:

In June 2020, the skyscraper had topped-out at level 100, and by late 2020 construction concluded. Upon completion, Australia 108 claimed the following height distinctions from Eureka Tower: the tallest building in Melbourne and the tallest building in Australia to roof. Additionally, it became the second–tallest building in Australia overall, surpassed by Q1 Tower on the Gold Coast. The latter skyscraper reaches  in height via its spire, which is included in the first method (height to architectural top) and third method (height to tip) of ranking the heights of tall buildings according to the Council on Tall Buildings and Urban Habitat (CTBUH). Furthermore, Australia 108 is the Southern Hemisphere's only building with at least 100 floors, and only the second residential skyscraper in the world to comprise at least 100 floors, after the Princess Tower in Dubai.

Gallery

See also

 Eureka Tower
 List of tallest buildings in Melbourne
 List of tallest buildings in Australia

References

External links 

 Australia 108
 Australia 108 — on CTBUH Skyscraper Center

          

 

Skyscrapers in Melbourne
Residential skyscrapers in Australia
Apartment buildings in Melbourne
Residential buildings completed in 2020
2020 establishments in Australia
Buildings and structures in the City of Melbourne (LGA)
Southbank, Victoria